Shahrdari Ardabil Football Club is an Iranian football club based in Ardabil, Iran. In 2014, they were promoted to the Azadegan League for the first time in the club's history. They are the first team from Ardabil Province promoted to the Azadegan League. The team plays in Ali Daei Stadium and Ardabil's Takhti Stadium.

Season-by-Season

The table below shows the achievements of the club in various competitions.

See also
 2014–15 Hazfi Cup
 2014–15 Azadegan League

Football clubs in Iran
Association football clubs established in 1998
1998 establishments in Iran
Sport in Ardabil Province